The 1982 WTA German Open was a women's tennis tournament played on outdoor clay courts at the Rot-Weiss Tennis Club in West Berlin in West Germany that was part of the Toyota Series Category 3 tier of the 1982 WTA Tour. It was the 13th edition of the tournament and was held from 17 May through 23 May 1982. Fourth-seeded Bettina Bunge won the singles title and earned $18,000 first-prize money.

Finals

Singles
 Bettina Bunge defeated  Kathy Rinaldi 6–2, 6–2
 It was Bunge's 2nd title of the year and of her career.

Doubles
 Liz Gordon /  Beverly Mould defeated  Bettina Bunge /  Claudia Kohde-Kilsch 6–3, 6–4

Prize money

References

External links
 ITF tournament edition details

WTA German Open
WTA German Open
1982 in German tennis